MV SSG Edward A. Carter Jr. (AK-4544) was the second ship of the  built in 1985. The ship is named after Sergeant First Class Edward A. Carter Jr., an American soldier who was awarded the Medal of Honor during World War II.

Construction and commissioning 
The ship was built in 1985 at the Daewoo Shipyard, Koje, Yeongnam. She was put into the service of United States Lines as American Nebraska, Susan C and Nebraska from 1985 until the company's bankruptcy in 1986.

Nedlloyd later acquired the ship in 1988 and put in service as Nedlloyd Hudson until 2000. 

OOCL Hong Kong bought the ship and operated her as OOCL Innovation from 2000 until 2001. In which she was acquired by Sea-Land Service and commissioned for a year as Sealand Oregon.

On 1 March 2001, the ship was chartered by the Maersk Line for the Military Sealift Command and was put into the Prepositioning Program and the Maritime Prepositioning Ship Squadron 2 as MV SSG Edward A. Carter Jr. (AK-4544) on 13 June 2001.

SSG Edward A. Carter Jr. participated in Operation Trans Mariner on 30 July 2017.

References

LTC John U.D. Page-class cargo ship
1984 ships
Ships built in South Korea
Merchant ships of the United States
Cargo ships of the United States Navy
Container ships of the United States Navy